Events from the year 1641 in Denmark.

Incumbents 
 Monarch – Christian IV
 Steward of the Realm – Corfitz Ulfeldt

Events 
 18 March  The first diplomatic relations between Denmark and Portugal are established  when Portuguese diplomats Francisco de Sousa Coutinho and António Moniz de Carvalho are sent to Copenhagen. Christian IV choses not to offer the diplomats a formal audience as he did not wish to compromise the neutrality of Denmark in the Spain as part of the Restoration War.
 9 November – Maren Spliid, probably the best known alleged victim of the persecution of witches in Denmark, is burned.

Undated

 A new set of statues for the University of Copenhagen are issued.
 Hans Ulrik Gyldenløve is appointed as lensmand [bailiff] of the three castles, the Kronborg, Frederiksborg and Abrahamstrup (now the Jægerspris Castle).
 Christian IV starts the construction of Roskilde Kongevej (completed in 1642).
 Corfitz Ulfeldt is appointed as Steward of the Realm.
 Jacob Madsen becomes mayor of Copenhagen.

Culture

Architecture
 Christian IV's Chapel at Roskilde Cathedral is completed by Hans van Steenwinckel the Younger (finishing the work started by his brother  Lorenz van Steenwinckel).

Art
 Altarpiece of Maribo Cathedral.
 The pulpit of Øster Snede Church.
A chalice created by Klaus Christensen (Odense) is presented ato Viby Church by Knud Ulfeld til Urup (1600-46) in commemoration of his wife Anne Lykke of Hverringe (1595-1641).

Births

Deaths 
 30 March  Claus Daa, admiral and landowner (born 1579)
16 September – Rigborg Brockenhuus, noblewoman (born 1579).
9 November – Maren Spliid, alleged witch (born c. 1600)

Full date missing
Anne Lykke, noblewoman and landowner (born 1595).

Publications
 Ole Worm: De aureo cornu

References 

 
Denmark
Years of the 17th century in Denmark